George Benjamin Stephens (born September 28, 1867 in Romeo, Michigan – August 5, 1896 in Armada, Michigan), was an American baseball player who played pitcher in the Major Leagues from 1892 to 1894. He played for the Baltimore Orioles, Cincinnati Reds, and Washington Senators.

References

1867 births
1896 deaths
Major League Baseball pitchers
Baltimore Orioles (NL) players
19th-century baseball players
Washington Senators (1891–1899) players
Cincinnati Reds players
Columbus Buckeyes (minor league) players
Milwaukee Brewers (minor league) players
Milwaukee Creams players
Davenport Onion Weeders players
Burlington Babies players
Tacoma (minor league baseball) players
Burlington Hawkeyes players
Terre Haute Hottentots players
Peoria Distillers players
Green Bay (minor league baseball) players
Oakland Colonels players
Marinette Badgers players
Columbus Reds players
Chattanooga Warriors players
Baseball players from Michigan
People from Romeo, Michigan
Sportspeople from Metro Detroit